John Henry George Forgeham (14 May 1941 – 10 March 2017) was an English actor known for his television work, notably the role of businessman Frank Laslett in the ITV series Footballers' Wives.

Early life
Born in Kidderminster, Worcestershire, Forgeham moved to Erdington, Birmingham as a child, and trained at the Royal Academy of Dramatic Art (RADA) on a two-year scholarship (1962–1964) from where he graduated with a RADA Silver medal for Best Performance student.

Career

Stage
He was a member of the Royal Shakespeare Company (RSC) (from 1966 until 1972) and toured with the company both nationally and internationally. Whilst on tour in Australia he decided to stay longer than anticipated and founded the Globe Shakespeare Theatre in Sydney.

Television
His many TV credits include: The Avengers, Z-Cars, The Stone Tape, Crossroads (as Jim Baines) The Sweeney, Ivanhoe, Beau Geste, Minder,Footballers Wives,The Professionals, Shoestring, Juliet Bravo, C.A.T.S. Eyes, Give Us a Break, Lovejoy, Bergerac, The Governor, Pulaski, Making Out, Nice Work, Prime Suspect, London's Burning, Casualty, The Bill, Doctors and as Reg Pendleton in the Heartbeat episode, Rumours.

Film
Film appearances include: The Italian Job (1969), Adolf Hitler: My Part in His Downfall (1973), Spy Story (1976), Sheena (1984), Pope John Paul II (1984), The Laughter of God (1990), King of the Wind (1990), The Young Americans (1993), Staggered (1994), The Road to Ithaca (1999), Kiss of the Dragon (2001), Mean Machine (2001), Torture Room (2007) and Dead Man Running (2009).

Later life & death
In 2004 he appeared in the second series of the ITV weight loss show, Celebrity Fit Club. He replaced Freddie Starr as team captain, but was demoted five weeks later, the role being taken by James Whitaker.

Forgeham died suddenly from internal bleeding after breaking a collarbone when falling out of bed at his home in Worthing, West Sussex on 10 March 2017, aged 75.

Filmography

References

External links

1941 births
2017 deaths
English male film actors
English male television actors
Alumni of RADA
People from Kidderminster
Male actors from Worcestershire
20th-century English male actors
21st-century English male actors
Accidental deaths from falls